Grand Rabbi Shlomo Yosef Englard is the current Radziner Rebbe. He is considered an authority on Tekhelet and Rabbinic genealogy

Biography
Englard was born in Brooklyn New York. At the time of his birth, his father Rabbi Avrohom Yissochor Englard led a congregation in Crown Heights, Brooklyn. He had previously been the Rabbi of Sosnowiec, Poland and would later become Radziner Rebbe.

Radziner Rebbe
Following the death of his father on died on 20 Tishrei 5766 (2005), Englard became Radziner Rebbe. Englard writes a weekly publication  on the parsha titled Tiferes Radzyn.

Authority on Tekhelet
Englard is considered an authority on Tekhelet. He frequently lectures on the topic and was a featured speaker at the 2016 annual Agudath Israel of America Yarchei Kallah in Jerusalem Israel.

Authority on Rabbinical Genealogy
Englard is considered to be an authority on rabbinical genealogy. He has published his research in a number of articles in the journal Tsfunot. Several genealogists have quoted Englard’s work in articles published in Avotaynu.

Lineage of the Izhbitza-Radzin dynasty
{|align=center
|

External Links
Videos of Rabbi Englard Discussing Tekhelet By Gaby Lock on Techelet.info
 Video - "How can we use Techeiles from a non-Kosher Fish?" - Radziner Rebbe - Rabbi Shlomo Yosef Englard

References

Rebbes of Izhbitza–Radzin
Israeli Hasidic rabbis
American Hasidic rabbis
American emigrants to Israel
Year of birth missing (living people)
Living people